The Man Who Could Not Sleep was a 1915 silent film by Edison Studios. The film is now considered a lost film with known extant copies nearly informationless because of nitrate decomposition. It was directed by John H. Collins and based on a script by Mark Swan. It starred Marc McDermott, Julia Calhoun, and Charles Sutton.

The plot involved a judge named Jeffer (Marc McDermott) who is cursed by a woman to be unable to sleep after an unfair sentence.

References
The Man Who Could Not Sleep (lost silent Edison Studios film; 1915

External links

The Man Who Could Not Sleep (lost silent Edison Studios film; 1915)

1915 films
1915 lost films
American silent feature films
American black-and-white films
Films directed by J. Gordon Edwards
Lost drama films
Lost American films
1915 drama films
1910s American films